Joyce Feith Tafatatha (born April 18, 1998) is a Malawian athlete who specializes in swimming. She participated in the London 2012 Olympics for Malawi in the women's 50 m freestyle swimming event. She currently holds a number of swimming records in Malawi. She recently moved to the Netherlands to further her swimming career after a brilliant showing at the 2012 London Summer Olympics, in which she swam a Personal Best time of 27.74.

Personal life
She began competing competitively when she was a student at Saint Andrew's International High School in Blantyre. She swam for Liyani Swimming Club based at the Saint Andrew's International High School, she competed at a national and international level for Malawi, she holds many Malawi national records. She stunned all when she broke 6 national records in the Malawi National Swimming Championships at Bishop Mackenzie International School in March 2012.

She recently moved to Netherlands to advance her swimming career.

Career
She began here swimming career at a young age and continued swimming competitively throughout high school. She held a number of Malawi national records.

Events

Cana Zone IV Swimming
She won four medals at the Cana Swimming Games. Including two Gold medals and a Silver Medal in swimming at the Cana Zone IV Swimming Championships - Mozambique.

Olympics 2012
She was 14 when she competed in the 2012 games, making her and Aurelie Fanchette the two youngest competitors at the London 2012 games.

References

Malawian female swimmers
Olympic swimmers of Malawi
Swimmers at the 2012 Summer Olympics
Living people
1998 births
Alumni of Saint Andrews International High School
Swimmers at the 2014 Summer Youth Olympics
Commonwealth Games competitors for Malawi
Swimmers at the 2014 Commonwealth Games
Malawian female freestyle swimmers